Welington Wildy Muniz dos Santos (born 21 April 1991 in Bauru, São Paulo), commonly known as França, is a Brazilian footballer who plays as a defensive midfielder for Noroeste.

França played with Coritiba, Criciúma and Noroeste before making his debut in Campeonato Brasileiro Série A with Figueirense FC.

References

External links
 
 

1991 births
Living people
People from Bauru
Brazilian footballers
Brazilian expatriate footballers
Campeonato Brasileiro Série A players
Campeonato Brasileiro Série B players
Coritiba Foot Ball Club players
Criciúma Esporte Clube players
Sociedade Esportiva Palmeiras players
Figueirense FC players
Londrina Esporte Clube players
Hannover 96 players
Clube do Remo players
Brusque Futebol Clube players
Boa Esporte Clube players
Associação Atlética Internacional (Limeira) players
Esporte Clube Noroeste players
Brazilian expatriate sportspeople in Germany
Expatriate footballers in Germany
Association football midfielders
Footballers from São Paulo (state)